David Pennington (died 10 July 2018) was a British powerlifter.

Born in Middlesbrough, England, David was a 3 time gold medallist in the World Powerlifting Congress (WPC) Championships. He also achieved a gold medal at the WPC European Powerlifting Championships 2016 and a silver medal at the WPC European Championships 2017.

He won his first WPC Championship gold medal in Louisiana, USA in 2016 and two gold medals in Moscow in 2017 which he won in two successive days and in two different weight categories. In 2018 Dave set his second WPC World Record with a 190 kg bench press in the M3, 110 kg raw full power classic at the Alan Collins Cup. Dave's bench press in the raw full power classic in both the 100 kg and 110 kg M3 category has placed him number 1 in the overall British Rankings.

Early life 
Pennington was a competitive bodybuilder and won his first bodybuilding competition in 1992, winning the first timers in an English Federation of Body Builders (EFBB) (UKBFF) competition which qualified him for the British finals. He continued to compete and train at various gyms throughout the UK. He entered his first powerlifting competition at the age of 49.

Pennington died 10 July 2018 after sustaining an injury in competition.

Medals 

BPU British Championships

WPC European Championships - Representing 

WPC World Championships - Representing 

BPU British Records

WPC World Records

References 

Male powerlifters
1966 births
Living people
British powerlifters